The men's 1500 metre freestyle competition at the 2022 Mediterranean Games was held on 2 and 3 July 2022 at the Aquatic Center of the Olympic Complex in Bir El Djir.

Records
Prior to this competition, the existing world and Mediterranean Games records were as follows:

Results

Heats
The heats were started on 2 July at 11:39.

Final 
The final was held on 3 July at 18:58.

References

Men's 1500 metre freestyle